Fran Quinn Jr. (born March 11, 1965) is an American professional golfer who currently plays on the PGA Tour Champions. He previously played on the PGA Tour and the Nationwide Tour.

Early life and education 
Quinn was born in Worcester, Massachusetts, and graduated from Saint John's High School in 1983. He earned a Bachelor of Arts degree in economics from Northwestern University in 1987 and turned professional in 1988.

Career 
Quinn played his first full season on the Nationwide Tour, then Ben Hogan Tour, in 1991, where he made 13 of 25 cuts. Later in the year he finished T8 at Q-School, obtaining his PGA Tour card for 1992. He made six of 18 cuts in 1992 and lost his tour card for 1993. 

Quinn played off and on the PGA and Nationwide Tour's from 1993 to 1997, until he shifted his focus mainly to the Nationwide Tour. In 1999, Quinn picked up his first win on a major tour at the Nike Dakota Dunes Open in a playoff. He had three top-10s on the season. 

Quinn won his first start of 2000 at the Buy.com Florida Classic, but it was his only top 10 of the season. He finished with $125,000 in season-long earnings. After his 2000 win, Quinn saw his game come to a standstill. From 2002 to mid-2009, he played in over 300 events, without another win, finishing in the top-10 17 times. 

Quinn saw his career be resurrected in late 2009 at the Albertsons Boise Open in September. He went head-to-head in the final round with Blake Adams, who had led after all three rounds. Quinn found himself tied for the lead at the 18th hole. He hit his approach within 10 feet and knocked in his birdie putt after Adams failed to make his. It was Quinn's third career Nationwide Tour win, and it put him to over $1,000,000 in Nationwide Tour career earnings. It also vaulted him from 92nd to 18th on the 2009 money list. He finished the year 25th on the money list to earn his 2010 PGA Tour card.

Stress fractures limited Quinn to seven PGA Tour events in 2010, where he made two cuts. Quinn also played in three Nationwide Tour events in 2010, where he won his fourth career Nationwide Tour event, the Panama Claro Championship. He played the 2011 and 2012 seasons on a Major Medical Exemption, which he was unable to satisfy.

At the 2014 U.S. Open, Quinn had to go through local and sectional qualifying just to make the field. He ended the first round tied for second. It was his first U.S. Open since 1996. In 2022, Quinn became the oldest player to earn entry to the U.S. Open via qualifying, at age 57.

Amateur wins
1986 Massachusetts Amateur

Professional wins (8)

Asian Tour wins (2)

Nationwide Tour wins (4)

Nationwide Tour playoff record (1–1)

Other wins (2)
1990 Massachusetts Open
1997 New Hampshire Open

Results in major championships

CUT = missed the half-way cut
"T" = Tied
NT = No tournament due to the COVID-19 pandemic
Note: Quinn never played in the Masters Tournament or the PGA Championship.

See also
1991 PGA Tour Qualifying School graduates
2009 Nationwide Tour graduates
List of golfers with most Web.com Tour wins

References

External links

American male golfers
Northwestern Wildcats men's golfers
PGA Tour golfers
PGA Tour Champions golfers
Korn Ferry Tour graduates
Golfers from Massachusetts
Sportspeople from Worcester, Massachusetts
People from Holden, Massachusetts
Sportspeople from Worcester County, Massachusetts
1965 births
Living people